Alyoshkino is a rural locality (a selo) in Goncharovsky Selsoviet, Fyodorovsky District, Bashkortostan, Russia. The population was 240 as of 2010. There are 4 streets.

Geography 
Alyoshkino is located 14 km west of Fyodorovka (the district's administrative centre) by road. Goncharovka is the nearest rural locality.

References 

Rural localities in Fyodorovsky District